Lynne Marsh (born 1969) is a Canadian artist. She was born in Vancouver, British Columbia.

Marsh is primarily known for her work in the fields of photography and video. Her work is included in the collections of the National Gallery of Canada and the Musée national des beaux-arts du Québec.

In 2021, UCR Arts hosted “Lynne Marsh: Who Raised It Up So Many Times?” which was Marsh's first "comprehensive U.S. solo exhibition."

References

20th-century Canadian women artists
21st-century Canadian women artists
1969 births
Living people
21st-century Canadian artists
20th-century Canadian artists